Hajjiabad (also Romanized as Ḩājjīābād; also known as Kalāteh-ye Ḩājj Ḩasan Qolī) is a village in Qaleh Hamam Rural District, Salehabad County, Razavi Khorasan Province, Iran. At the 2006 census, its population was 603, in 136 families.

References 

Populated places in   Torbat-e Jam County